North Grimston railway station was a railway station on the Malton & Driffield Railway. It opened on 19 May 1853, and served the village of North Grimston, North Yorkshire, England. It closed on 5 June 1950 but the station remained open for goods traffic until 18 October 1958
when the line finally closed. The station was unusual in that the single platform was bisected by a road with a level crossing.

References

External links
 North Grimston station on navigable 1947 O. S. map
North Grimston station at The Yorkshire Wolds Railway Restoration Project

Disused railway stations in North Yorkshire
Railway stations in Great Britain opened in 1853
Railway stations in Great Britain closed in 1950
Former Malton and Driffield Junction Railway stations